Ploscoș is a commune in Cluj County, Transylvania, Romania. It is composed of four villages: Crairât (Királyrét), Lobodaș (Labodás), Ploscoș and Valea Florilor (Virágosvölgy).

Demographics 
According to the census from 2011 there was a total population of 677 people living in this commune. Of this population, 98.08% are ethnic Romanians, 1.92% are ethnic Romani.

References

Atlasul localităților județului Cluj (Cluj County Localities Atlas), Suncart Publishing House, Cluj-Napoca, 

Communes in Cluj County
Localities in Transylvania